Ethan Kross is an American experimental psychologist, neuroscientist and writer, who specializes in emotion regulation. He is a professor of psychology and management at the University of Michigan and director of the Emotion & Self Control Laboratory there. Kross lives in Ann Arbor, Michigan.

Early life and education
Kross was born and raised in Brooklyn, New York. He earned a degree from the University of Pennsylvania, a PhD in psychology from Columbia University, and a post-doctoral fellowship in social-affective neuroscience.

Career
Since 2008, Kross has been at the University of Michigan, where he is now a professor of psychology and management. He founded the Emotion & Self Control Laboratory at the university and is its director. He studies the science of introspection, "the silent conversations people have with themselves: internal dialogues that powerfully influence how they live their lives."

A study by Kross and Philippe Verduyn of Leuven University in Belgium has shown that the more a person uses Facebook, the less satisfied they are with life. Other research by Kross and a colleague found that "the way that we process negative experiences can help reset that behavior." They found that when remembering a past experience, if people use self-distancing techniques—psychologically distancing themselves from a situation that is happening to them—"their stress levels and physical health indicators improved, and they were also better able to solve problems and resolve conflicts."

Personal life
Kross lives in Ann Arbor, Michigan with his wife and two daughters.

Publications
Chatter: The Voice in Our Head and How to Harness It. London: Vermilion, 2021. .

References

External links

21st-century American non-fiction writers
American psychology writers
American male non-fiction writers
American neuroscientists
21st-century American psychologists
People from Brooklyn
Living people
Year of birth missing (living people)
University of Michigan faculty
Columbia University School of General Studies alumni
21st-century American male writers